Tomlinson Mansion is a historic home located at Williamstown, Wood County, West Virginia.  It was built in 1839, and is a two-story, "L"-shaped brick building with a slate-covered gable roof.  The front facade features a small, pediment-like roof above the front door that is supported by four rectangular columns.  It is the oldest home in Williamstown and its most notable guest was John James Audubon, who stayed at the Tomlinson Mansion while collecting material on the bluebird and other birds native to the area.

It was listed on the National Register of Historic Places in 1974.

References

Houses in Parkersburg, West Virginia
Houses on the National Register of Historic Places in West Virginia
Houses completed in 1839
National Register of Historic Places in Wood County, West Virginia